This is the List of municipalities in Burdur Province, Turkey .

References 

Geography of Burdur Province
Burdur